Tru Davies is the main character of the TV series Tru Calling. She is portrayed by Eliza Dushku.

Childhood 
At the age of only 12 years old, Tru witnessed the murder of her mother, Elise Davies. Later in the series, it is revealed that Carl Neesan (Wade Andrew Williams), the hitman who killed her was hired by Tru's father, Richard. After her mother's demise, Tru, her younger brother Harrison and  older sister Meredith were abandoned by their father and little has been revealed about who raised them from that point on.

Supernatural power 
Tru possesses the power to relive the current day when a corpse asks for her help to turn back the clock in order to save his/her Life, or help someone whom the corpse affected in some way. Mostly triumphant, Tru has on occasion been unsuccessful in saving lives, sometimes because of the interference of Jack Harper and sometimes because the corpse was not meant to live. On some occasions her power changed. An instance of this was when a group of five corpses all asked for her help at the same time. Other times her day rewound more than once on an already rewound day, as in "The Longest Day" and "Grace". In "The Last Good Day", when a dead woman asked Jack Harper for help, Tru finally discovered what Jack saw when a corpse would ask her for help. She described this as a Dark Feeling which she would never want to experience again.

Good vs. Evil 
Although both can relive days, it has never been said who is evil, Tru or Jack. Jack has always been portrayed as evil, which Jack denies, although at certain times Jack has broken the rules of preserving fate, such as to make Luc die to teach Tru a lesson.
 
While Tru claims that she is saving people who were taken before their time, Jack claims that he is merely preserving fate, and that if Tru saves someone who is meant to die, she creates a ripple effect in fate.

Romantic relationships 
Mark Evans - Tru's college Professor. After Tru spotted Mark cheating on her with another one of his students, she ended the relationship. When Tru had a party, Mark visited, only to be killed by one of Tru's friends. Tru then saved his life after he asked her for help and have a proper closure of their relationship.
Nick Kelly - A fireman that was killed in a fire but then asked Tru for help. He was killed again in the same fire on his and Tru's first day together, though he did save a little girl that died with him before when he asked Tru for help.
Luc Johnston - Luc is the crime scene photographer that works with Tru. Tru and Luc started dating and fell in love. However, Luc always questioned why Tru would always take off at a moments notice, and he broke up with her, as he felt she was hiding something from him. After Tru finally revealed the truth to him, he refused to believe it. Jack then tricked him into going to a house looking for someone who would "provide clearer answers". Luc was instead shot and killed by an insanely jealous husband, who mistook Luc for his wife's supposed lover.
Jensen Ritchie - Tru's college mate in med school, who was in a serious relationship when they first met. After he breaks up with his girlfriend, him and Tru spend a day together and end up kissing outside her apartment. Then he was killed in a robbery of an antique store where he was buying an old medic case for Tru. When he is brought to the morgue, he never asks for help, but later in the day a different man who was killed asks for Tru's help. On the second day, Tru saves Jensen from being hit by a car driven by the very same victim she had to save that day. Though, Davis and Jack warn her that there is a reason that Jensen did not ask for help. That it is his fate to die in the robbery, and her changing fate will have consequences. We never get to learn those consequences, since the show is cancelled abruptly. According to the writers of the show; because of his near death experience, he starts to become fascinated by death, which leads to him becoming a serial killer.

Analysis
Karin Beeler argues that Davies is a "unique postfeminist reconstruction of the Cassandra figure." Dominique Mainon and James Ursini view her as a woman warrior, "battling not only potential killers and accidental chains of events, but also time."

References

Fantasy television characters
Television characters introduced in 2003
Fictional spiritual mediums
Time travelers
American female characters in television